The 2013 NCAA Division Men's III Ice Hockey Tournament was the culmination of the 2012–13 season, the 30th such tournament in NCAA history. It concluded with Wisconsin–Eau Claire defeating Oswego State in the championship game 5-3. All First Round and Quarterfinal matchups were held at home team venues, while all succeeding games were played at the Herb Brooks Arena in Lake Placid, New York.

Qualifying teams
The following teams qualified for the tournament. Automatic bids were offered to the conference tournament champion of eight different conferences. Three at-large bids were available for the highest-ranked non-conference tournament champions (overall seed in parentheses).

Format
The tournament featured four rounds of play. All rounds were Single-game elimination. The top four ranked teams received byes into the quarterfinal round and were arranged so that were they all to reach the national semifinal the first seed would play the fourth seed and the second seed would play the third seed.

Because the top four ranked teams were split evenly between eastern and western teams these teams were automatically advanced into the Quarterfinal round. The remaining two western teams were placed in the dame First Round game with the winner advancing to play the top western seed. The bottom four eastern teams were arranged as follows; the fourth eastern seed would play the seventh eastern seed with the winner advancing to play the second eastern seed while the fifth eastern seed would play the sixth eastern seed with the winner advancing to play the top eastern seed.

The remaining team, the third eastern seed, received a bye into the quarterfinal to play the second western seed.

In the First Round and Quarterfinals the higher-seeded or ranked team served as host.

Tournament Bracket

Note: * denotes overtime period(s)

All-Tournament Team
G: Brandon Stephenson (Wisconsin–Eau Claire)
D: Drew Darwitz (Wisconsin–Eau Claire)
D: Bobby Gertsakis (Oswego State)
F: Jordan Singer* (Wisconsin–Eau Claire)
F: Kurt Weston (Wisconsin–Eau Claire)
F: Chris Muise (Oswego State)
* Most Outstanding Player(s)

Record by conference

References

External links
Division III Men's Ice Hockey Record Book

 
NCAA Division III ice hockey